Kuwait Ministry of Awqaf and Islamic Affairs is a cabinet department of the executive branch of the government of Kuwait dedicated to spreading tolerant Islamic culture. Specifically, it seeks to spread awareness and expand the influence of Islamic faith, Islamic history, and Islamic sciences.

Activities 

The ministry handles all religious affairs in Kuwait, including regulating all places of worship in the country, overseeing religious groups and activities, issuing fatwas through its Fatwa Committee, and organizing and regulating the annual Hajj for Qatari residents. The ministry's Moon Sighting Committee is responsible for determining the dates of Islamic holidays such as Eid Al-Fitr.

The ministry actively promotes tolerance and moderation in Islamic faith. It promotes memorization and recitation of the Quran. It funds the building of mosques both within and outside of Kuwait. The ministry includes the Zakat Fund, which collects Zakat al-Fitr.
The Islam Presentation Committee is a division of the Ministry of Awqaf and Islamic Affairs which encourages proselytizing Islam to non-Muslim prisoners and foreign workers.

The Kuwait Ministry of Awqaf and Islamic Affairs funds a variety of other activities, including promoting Islamic science and technology, humanitarian aid after natural disasters around the world, and the Kuwait Islamic Arts Center.

History 

In 2005 and 2006, the ministry funded studies of Western perceptions of Islam and Islamic perceptions of Western culture,
 and sought to improve the relationship between these cultures.

In 2008 and 2009, the ministry sponsored the development of a Muslim Seven Year Action Plan on Climate Change.

Since 2015, the ministry has sought to promote moderate Islam against Islamic extremism. The ministry includes a Supreme Commission for the Promotion of Moderation.
In 2015, the ministry undertook a purge of members of the Muslim Brotherhood from its staff.

In 2016, the ministry made an administrative decision limiting the appointment of foreigners in Kuwait government positions. , there were 4,028 expats working in the awqaf ministry.

In 2017, the ministry laid off 2,032 employees in order to reduce its expenses. The cuts were especially significant in the office of the Assistant Undersecretary for Quran and Islamic Studies, which lost the vast majority of its staff.

In 2018, the ministry changed its policies to allow women in senior positions.

In 2020, Former Kuwait Minister of Oil Ali Ahmed Al-Baghli accused the Ministry of Awqaf and Islamic Affairs of excessive spending in its fiscal year 2020/2021 budget, attributing the spending to nepotism.

Ministers 
 Yusuf Al-Hadji, 1970s
 Yaacoub Abdulmohsen Al-Sanaa, 2015
 Mohammad Nasser Al-Jabri, December 2016 – December 2017
 Fahad Mohammad Al-Afasi, December 2017 – December 2018
 Fahad al-Shaala, December 2018 – December 2019
 Fahad Mohammad Al-Afasi, December 2019 –

Notes

References

External links 
 

Ministry of Awqaf and Islamic Affairs
Ministry of Awqaf and Islamic Affairs
Kuwait Ministry of Awqaf and Islamic Affairs